The women's freestyle 68 kg is a competition featured at the 2019 European Wrestling Championships, and was held in Bucharest, Romania on April 10 and April 11.

Medalists

Results 
 Legend
 F — Won by fall

Main bracket

Repechage

References

Women's Freestyle 68 kg
2019 in women's sport wrestling